Marston Lake is a reservoir in Denver, Colorado. It is owned by Denver Water and was completed in 1902. The reservoir sends water to the Marston treatment plant, and from there the water is distributed to Denver residents.

The reservoir receives water from the South Platte River. The river receives water from the Colorado Western Slope through a transmountain diversion via the Roberts Tunnel.

Climate

According to the Köppen Climate Classification system, Marston Lake has a cold semi-arid climate, abbreviated "BSk" on climate maps.

See also
 List of reservoirs in Colorado

References

Reservoirs in Colorado
United States local public utility dams
Bodies of water of Denver